The Kerala State Film Awards are the film awards for a motion picture made in Kerala. The awards started in 1969 by the Department of Cultural Affairs, Government of Kerala and since 1998 the awards have been bestowed by Kerala State Chalachitra Academy on behalf of the Department of Cultural Affairs.

The awardees are decided by an independent jury formed by the academy and the Department of Cultural Affairs, Govt. of Kerala. The jury usually consists of eminent personalities from the film field. For the awards for literature on cinema a separate jury is formed. The academy annually invites films for the award and the jury analyses the films that are submitted before deciding the winners. The awards intends to promote films with artistic values and encourage artists, technicians and producers. The awards are declared by the Minister for Cultural Affairs and are presented by the Chief Minister of Kerala.

List of awards 

The number of awards varies from year to year, considering the changing scenario of motion picture arts within and outside the state of Kerala. The latest number of awards is over 30; the original number of awards in 1969 was 15.
 J. C. Daniel Award (Lifetime Achievement Awards) for "Outstanding contributions to Malayalam cinema".
 Best Film: A cash award of Rs.100,000/-, a replica and a certificate to the producer. A cash award of Rs.40,000/-, a replica and a certificate to the director 
 Second Best Film: A cash award of Rs.60,000/-, a replica and a certificate to the producer. A cash award of Rs.30,000/-, a replica and a certificate to the director
 Kerala State Film Award for Best Short Film
 Best Director: A cash award of Rs.50,000/-, a replica 
 Best Actor: A cash award of 1 Lakh, a replica and a certificate
 Best Actress: A cash award of 1 Lakh, a replica and a certificate
 Best Character Actor: A cash award of Rs.50000/-, a replica and a certificate
 Best Character Actress: A cash award of Rs.50000//-, a replica and a certificate
 Second Best Actor: A cash award of Rs.50000/-, a replica and a certificate
 Second Best Actress: A cash award of Rs.50000//-, a replica and a certificate
 Best Comedian: (1969-72, 2008-2013. Discontinued after 2013)
 Best Child Artist: A cash award of Rs.50000//-, a replica and a certificate
 Best Story: A cash award of Rs.50000//-, a replica and a certificate
 Best Screenplay: A cash award of Rs.15,000/-, a replica and a certificate
 Best Cinematography: A cash award of Rs.15,000/-, a replica and a certificate
 Best Lyrics: A cash award of Rs.15,000/-, a replica and a certificate
 Best Music Director: A cash award of Rs.15,000/-, a replica and a certificate
 Best Background Music: A cash award of Rs.15,000/-, a replica and a certificate
 Best Singer: A cash award of Rs.15,000/-, a replica and a certificate
 Best Film Editor: A cash award of Rs.15,000/-, a replica and a certificate
 Best Art Director: A cash award of Rs.15,000/-, a replica and a certificate
 Best Sound Recordist: A cash award of Rs.15,000/-, a replica and a certificate
 Best Processing Lab: A cash award of Rs.15,000/-, a replica and a certificate
 Best Makeup Artist: A cash award of Rs.15,000/-, a replica and a certificate
 Best Costume Designer: A cash award of Rs.15,000/-, a replica and a certificate
 Best Dubbing Artist: A cash award of Rs.7,500/-, a replica and a certificate each
 Best Choreography: A cash award of Rs.15,000/-, a replica and a certificate
 Best Film with Popular Appeal and Aesthetic Value: To the producer and director
 Best Children's Film: To the producer and director
 Best Debut Director
 Special Jury Award: A cash award of Rs.30,000/-, a replica and a certificate
 Special Mention: A replica and a certificate
 Best Documentary: A cash award of Rs.15,000/-, a replica and a certificate to the producer. A cash award of Rs.9,000/-, a replica and a certificate to the director
 Best Book on Cinema: A cash award of Rs.15,000/-, a replica and a certificate 
 Best Article on Cinema: A cash award of Rs.8,000/-, a replica and a certificate

Jury

List of Movies with Most Awards in Each Year

See also
 2009 Kerala State Film Awards
2010 Kerala State Film Awards
 2016 Kerala State Film Awards

References

External links

STATE FILM AWARDS 1969 - 2001
malayalasangeetham.info: State Awards for Singers, Music Directors, Lyricists (in Malayalam)
Official Awardees List
 Kerala State Film Awards 2015 Announced-Complete-List
 Kerala State Film Awards 2014 Announced Complete List
 Kerala State Film Awards 2014 Announced-Winners List
 Kerala State Film Awards 2016 Announced Complete List

 
Malayalam cinema
Awards established in 1969
Indian film awards
1969 establishments in Kerala